Jacob F. Markle Stone House is a historic home located at Rochester in Ulster County, New York.  It is a -story, five-bay stone dwelling built about 1770 upon a linear plan.  Also on the property is a -story gable-front frame shed.

It was listed on the National Register of Historic Places in 1995.

References

Houses on the National Register of Historic Places in New York (state)
Houses completed in 1770
Houses in Ulster County, New York
National Register of Historic Places in Ulster County, New York
1770 establishments in the Province of New York